Violaxanthin de-epoxidase (VDE) is an enzyme with systematic name violaxanthin:ascorbate oxidoreductase. This enzyme catalyses the following chemical reaction

 violaxanthin + 2 L-ascorbate  zeaxanthin + 2 L-dehydroascorbate + 2 H2O (overall reaction)
 (1a) violaxanthin + L-ascorbate  antheraxanthin + L-dehydroascorbate + H2O
 (1b) antheraxanthin + L-ascorbate  zeaxanthin + L-dehydroascorbate + H2O

Violaxanthin de-epoxidase is a part of the xanthophyll (or violaxanthin) cycle for controlling the concentration of zeaxanthin in chloroplasts.

References

External links 
 

EC 1.10.99